Peter Herbert "Jacko" Jackson (15 November 1912 – 5 February 1983) was an English rower who competed at the 1936 Summer Olympics.

Jackson rowed for London Rowing Club and in 1932 was a member of the crew that won the Thames Challenge Cup at Henley Royal Regatta. In  1933 his crew won the Grand Challenge Cup at Henley.  Jackson was also a competitive sculler. He raced in skiffs for The Skiff Club and in 1934, partnering Jock Wise won the Gentlemen's Double Sculls at the Skiff Championships Regatta. In the single scull, he won the Wingfield Sculls in 1935 and 1936. He was a member of the coxless four crew with Martin Bristow, Alan Barrett and  John Sturrock who won Silver medal for Great Britain rowing at the 1936 Summer Olympics.

Jackson was a member of the eight that won Gold medal for England in the 1938 British Empire Games. In the same games, he won the silver medal rowing in the Single Scull. Also in 1938, he won the Wingfield Sculls for the third time.

Jackson was Commanding Officer of the 10th Royal Hussars regiment.

When Jackson asked his CO permission for time off for the games, the senior rank was reluctant because leave had already been granted for Henley – so Peter picked him up and held him over the banister of the stairwell until he agreed

Jackson died in Cirencester, Gloucestershire aged 70.

Achievements
Olympic Games
1936 – Silver, Coxless Fours

British Empire Games
1938 – Silver, Single Sculls (lost to Herb Turner, AUS)
1938 – Bronze, Double Sculls – (exhibition event)
1938 – Gold, Eights

Wingfield Sculls
1935
1936
1938

Henley Royal Regatta
1932 – Thames Challenge Cup (racing for London Rowing Club)
1933 – Grand Challenge Cup (racing for London Rowing Club)
1938 – Grand Challenge Cup (racing for London Rowing Club)

Head of the River Race
1933
1934
1935
1936
1939

Skiff Championships
1934 Gentlemen's Double Sculls (With C W Wise)

References

1912 births
1983 deaths
English male rowers
10th Royal Hussars officers
Olympic rowers of Great Britain
Rowers at the 1936 Summer Olympics
Olympic silver medallists for Great Britain
Rowers at the 1938 British Empire Games
Commonwealth Games gold medallists for England
Commonwealth Games silver medallists for England
People from Cirencester
Olympic medalists in rowing
Sportspeople from Gloucestershire
Medalists at the 1936 Summer Olympics
Commonwealth Games medallists in rowing
Medallists at the 1938 British Empire Games